Peter Robert Varville Ledden (born 12 July 1943) is a former English cricketer. Ledden was a left-handed batsman who bowled right-arm medium pace. He was born at Scarborough, Yorkshire.

Ledden made his first-class debut for Sussex against Surrey at the County Ground, Hove, in the 1961 County Championship. He made 34 further first-class appearances for the county, the last of which came against Oxford University in 1967. With the bat, he scored a total of 756 runs at an average of 15.12, with a high score of 98. This score was one of four half centuries he made and came against Warwickshire in 1964. With the ball, he took 8 wickets at a bowling average of 42.25, with best figures of 5/43, which came against Cambridge University in 1966. 

Ledden also played List A cricket for Sussex, making his debut in that format against Yorkshire in the 1963 Gillette Cup. He made three further List A appearances for Sussex, against Surrey in the 1964 Gillette Cup, the touring Australians in 1964, and Somerset in the 1966 Gillette Cup. In his four matches, he scored a total of 23 runs at an average of 5.75, with a high score of 12.

References

External links
Peter Ledden at ESPNcricinfo

1943 births
Living people
Cricketers from Scarborough, North Yorkshire
English cricketers
Sussex cricketers
English cricketers of 1946 to 1968